is a Japanese footballer who plays for Iwate Grulla Morioka.

Career
After four seasons for Kataller Toyama, Wakimoto joined Iwate Grulla Morioka in January 2020.

Club statistics
Updated to 23 February 2018.

References

External links

Profile at Kataller Toyama

1994 births
Living people
Tokyo Gakugei University alumni
Association football people from Hiroshima Prefecture
Japanese footballers
J3 League players
Kataller Toyama players
Iwate Grulla Morioka players
Association football defenders